The Tough and the Mighty is a 1969 Italian drama film directed by Carlo Lizzani. It is based on the real-life events of Italian bandit Graziano Mesina.

Cast 
Terence Hill: Graziano Cassitta
Don Backy: Miguel Lopez
Frank Wolff: Spina
Peter Martell: Antonio Masara
Clelia Matania: La madre di Graziano 
Ezio Sancrotti: Nino Benedetto
Tano Cimarosa: Cartana 
Attilio Dottesio: Il padre di Nino 
Gabriele Tinti: Nanni Ripari
Rossana Martini: Signora Benedetto
Helene Ronee: Anania
Franco Silva: Avvocato Arecu
Rosalba Neri: Girl at Party

References

External links

1969 films
Films directed by Carlo Lizzani
1960s biographical drama films
Biographical films about Italian bandits
Films shot in Sardinia
Films set in Sardinia
Italian biographical drama films
1969 drama films
Cultural depictions of Italian men
1960s Italian-language films
1960s Italian films